The Visalia Rawhide are a Minor League Baseball team of the California League and the Single-A affiliate of the Arizona Diamondbacks. They are located in Visalia, California, and have played their home games at Valley Strong Ballpark since their inception in 1946.

The team has had nine names, most of which reflected its changing major-league affiliates, most recently the Minnesota Twins, Colorado Rockies, Oakland A's, Tampa Bay Rays, and Diamondbacks. They took the name Rawhide in 2009.

Casey Jones/Casey at the Bat 
Once per season, the team wears old-fashioned uniforms recalling Mighty Casey, the main folklore hero of "Casey at the Bat" and the "Mudville Nine", based on the Stockton Ports in Stockton.

Visalia is one of the four oldest cities of the Cal League, along with San Jose (the San Jose Giants/Bees); and Modesto (the Modesto Nuts/A's).

Mascot
The Visalia Rawhide mascot is a Holstein Bull named Tipper, introduced on October 15, 2008. Tipper represents the tens of thousands of Holsteins in Tulare County, the top dairy-producing area in the country. Tipper's home is a ballpark barn – a 40' x 20' red barn which is part of the outfield fence – doubles carom off the side of the barn, and home runs land on the roof, leading to a new twist on the old baseball adage "couldn't hit the broad side of the barn" which now represents weak hitters instead of wild pitchers. The traditional red barn was built as a "community barn raising" to raise awareness for Habitat for Humanity and stands as an icon for the agricultural heritage of the valley.

Radio broadcast
The Rawhide are heard terrestrially on KJUG AM 1270 and over the internet through their website www.rawhidebaseball.com.

Notable Visalia alumni

Baseball Hall of Fame alumni

 Randy Johnson (2007) Inducted, 2015
 Kirby Puckett (1983) Inducted, 2001

Notable alumni

 Jack Aker (1960)
 Allan Anderson (1984) 1988 AL ERA Leader
 Trevor Bauer (2011)
 Ken Berry (1962) MLB All-Star
 Jay Bell (1985) 2 x MLB All-Star
 Geoff Blum (2011)
 Eric Byrnes (1998, 2008)
 Marty Cordova (1991–1992) 1995 AL Rookie of the Year
 John Castino (1977) 1979 AL Rookie of the Year
Joe Charboneau (1978) 1980 AL Rookie of the Year
 Eric Chavez (1995)
 Craig Counsell (1993)
 Vic Davalillo (1958) MLB All-Star
Sean Doolittle
 Zach Duke (2011)
 Adam Eaton (2011, 2013)
 Johnny Edwards (1959) 3 x MLB All-Star
 Scott Erickson (1989) MLB All-Star
 Tim Foli (1969)
Paul Goldschmidt (2010) 2013 NL Home Run & RBI Leader;  5 x MLB All-Star
 Tom Gordon (2008) 3 x MLB All-Star
Kevin Gregg (1997)
 Eddie Guardado (1992) 2 x MLB All-Star
 Mark Guthrie (1987)
 Ken Harrelson (1961) MLB All-Star
 Kent Hrbek (1981)  MLB All-Star
 Aubrey Huff (2006)
 Ubaldo Jiménez (2004) MLB All-Star
 Jake Lamb (2013) MLB All-Star
 Chuck Knoblauch (1989) 4 x MLB All-Star; 1991 AL Rookie of the Year
 Tom Kelly (1979–1980, MGR) 1991 AL Manager of the Year; Manager: 2 x World Series Champion – Minnesota Twins (1987, 1991)
 Evan Longoria (2006) 3 x MLB All Star; 2008 AL Rookie of the Year
 Lee Mazzilli (1975) MLB All-Star
 John Milner (1969)
 Jerry Morales (1968) MLB All-Star
Denny Neagle (1990, 2003) 2 x MLB All-Star
 Vada Pinson (1957) 4 x MLB All-Star
 A.J. Pollock (2016) MLB All-Star
 Mark Portugal (1983)
Max Scherzer (2007) 5 x MLB All-Star; 2 x Cy Young Award (2013 AL, 2016 NL)
 José Santiago (1962) MLB All-Star
 Ken Singleton (1968) 3 x MLB All-Star
Nick Swisher (2002) MLB All-Star
Juan Uribe (2003)
Justin Upton (2007, 2009) 4 x MLB All-Star
 Barry Zito (1999) 3 x MLB All-Star; 2002 AL Cy Young Award

Pop culture
As a minor league affiliate of the Oakland A's at the time, the Visalia Oaks were prominently mentioned in the Michael Lewis Book 'Moneyball', and also featured a few times during the 2011 movie Moneyball (which took place in 2002).  In one scene, Billy Beane is driving to see the Visalia Oaks during the A's winning streak, and another shows Billy watching video of Visalia Oaks catcher Jeremy Brown tripping and then diving back to first on a ball that turned out to be a home run.

In the 1988 film Bull Durham, Visalia was mentioned as a potential managing job for aging catcher Crash Davis, played by Kevin Costner.

In the 1994 film Little Big League, a Visalia Oaks pennant can be seen hanging on the wall in the main characters' bedroom.

Roster

Alumni
Visalia Oaks
Central Valley Rockies
Visalia Mets
Visalia Redlegs

Minor league affiliations

References

External links
 
 Statistics from Baseball-Reference

Baseball teams established in 1946
Arizona Diamondbacks minor league affiliates
Tampa Bay Devil Rays minor league affiliates
Colorado Rockies minor league affiliates
Oakland Athletics minor league affiliates
Minnesota Twins minor league affiliates
New York Mets minor league affiliates
Chicago White Sox minor league affiliates
Cincinnati Reds minor league affiliates
Chicago Cubs minor league affiliates
California League teams
Sports in Tulare County, California
Sports in Visalia, California
Professional baseball teams in California
1946 establishments in California